Dame Barbara Windsor  (born Barbara Ann Deeks; 6 August 193710 December 2020) was an English actress, known for her roles in the Carry On films and for playing Peggy Mitchell in the BBC One soap opera EastEnders. She joined the cast of EastEnders in 1994 and won the 1999 British Soap Award for Best Actress, before ultimately leaving the show in 2016 when her character was killed off.

Windsor began her career on stage in 1950 at the age of 13, and made her film debut as a schoolgirl in The Belles of St. Trinian's (1954) while studying shipping management at Bow Technical College. She received a BAFTA Award nomination for the film Sparrows Can't Sing (1963), and a Tony Award nomination for the 1964 Broadway production of Oh, What a Lovely War!. In 1972, she starred opposite Vanessa Redgrave in the West End production of The Threepenny Opera.

Between 1964 and 1974, she appeared in nine Carry On films, including Carry On Spying (1964), Carry On Doctor (1967), Carry On Camping (1969), Carry On Henry (1971), and Carry On Abroad (1972). She also co-presented the 1977 Carry On compilation That's Carry On!. Along with Jim Dale, she was one of the last surviving regulars on the series. Her other film roles included A Study in Terror (1965), Chitty Chitty Bang Bang (1968), and as the voice of Mallymkun, the Dormouse in Alice in Wonderland (2010) and Alice Through the Looking Glass (2016).

Windsor was made a Dame (DBE) in the 2016 New Year Honours for services to charity and entertainment. She was awarded Freedom of the City of London in 2010.

Early life
Windsor was born in Shoreditch, London, in 1937 (her birth was registered in Stepney), the only child of John Deeks, a bus driver, and his wife, Rose (née Ellis), a dressmaker. The family lived on Angela Street. Her maternal great-grandmother was the daughter of Irish immigrants who fled Ireland to Great Britain between 1846 and 1851 to escape the Great Famine of Ireland. 

In 1939, at the start of World War II, Windsor's father was called up for the war, so Windsor and her mother went to live with her mother's family in Yoakley Road, Stoke Newington, where Windsor attended St Mary's Infants' School in nearby Lordship Road. 

Windsor's mother initially refused to let her be evacuated, but conceded after one of Windsor's school friends was killed by a bomb during an air raid. Aged six, Windsor was evacuated to Blackpool to live with a couple, but they attempted to sexually abuse her. A neighbour heard Windsor's screams and alerted the authorities. The couple were arrested and were found to not be married, but to be brother and sister. 

Windsor moved in with a schoolfriend and her parents, although they struggled to cope with her loud behaviour. They sent Windsor to dancing school, which sparked her interest in performing, although one night after a class, Windsor found her friend's father kissing another woman in a bus shelter. Humiliated by this, Windsor was sent back to London in 1944 along with a note from her dance teacher which read: "Barbara is a born show-off who loves to perform."

Impressed by this, Windsor's mother sent her to Madame Behenna's Juvenile Jollities, a drama school at which she appeared in several charity concerts and pantomimes. After the war, she passed her 11-plus exams, gaining the top mark in North London, and earned a scholarship for a place at Our Lady's Catholic High School, Stamford Hill although she was expelled because she argued with the reverend mother after the latter refused to let Barbara have time off to appear in a pantomime. 

Windsor moved to the Aida Foster School, Golders Green, and took elocution lessons. When Windsor's father came to watch a performance, she was ridiculed by the others as her father had begun working as a trolley bus conductor and had come in his uniform. Enraged, Windsor covered the girls in theatrical face powder, throwing more over the chaperone who tried to stop her. Despite this, Windsor was chosen to appear in the chorus of the musical Love From Judy in the West End in 1952  which ran for a successful two years. Her stage name of "Windsor" was inspired by the Coronation of Elizabeth II in 1953. By the time Windsor was 16, Windsor's parents divorced and Windsor was unwillingly made to testify against her father in court. Awarded to her mother, following the divorce, Windsor's father ceased all contact with her and would ignore her if he saw Windsor in the street for many years afterwards.

Career
Windsor made her film debut as an uncredited extra in 1954 playing a schoolgirl in The Belles of St. Trinians, she followed this with several other uncredited roles until she appeared in Too Hot to Handle with Jayne Mansfield. According to Windsor, Mansfield demanded that she appear at the back of the scene they shared, as she was worried Windsor's blonde hair and large chest would overshadow her own. After this, Windsor made her television debut when Johnny Brandon, with whom Windsor had starred in Love from Judy, asked her to appear in his television series Dreamer's Highway. Windsor later appeared in musical shows Variety Parade, The Jack Jackson Show, and Six-Five Special, regularly singing with bands. She then became a regular cabaret act at Ronnie Scott's Jazz Club in Soho, and went on to do the same at the Winston's club alongside Danny La Rue and Amanda Barrie.

After joining Joan Littlewood's Theatre Workshop at the Theatre Royal, Stratford East, she came to prominence in their stage production Fings Ain't Wot They Used T'Be and Littlewood's film Sparrows Can't Sing (1963), achieving a BAFTA nomination for Best British Film Actress. She also appeared in the comedy films Crooks in Cloisters (1964) and San Ferry Ann (1965), the thriller film A Study in Terror (1965), the fantasy film Chitty Chitty Bang Bang (1968) and Ken Russell's musical film The Boy Friend (1971), and the TV sitcoms The Rag Trade and Wild, Wild Women.

Carry On films

Windsor came to prominence with her portrayals of a "good-time girl" in nine Carry On films. Her first was Carry On Spying in 1964 and her final one was Carry On Dick in 1974. She also appeared in several Carry On... television and compilation specials between 1964 and 1977.

One of her best known scenes was in Carry On Camping (1969), where her bikini top flew off during outdoor aerobic exercises. In typical Carry On style, exposure is implied, but little is, in fact, seen.

From 1973 to 1975, she appeared with several of the Carry On team in the West End revue Carry On London!.

She was strongly identified with the Carry On films for many years, which restricted the roles she was offered later in her career.

Theatre work
Windsor starred on Broadway in the Theatre Workshop's Oh, What a Lovely War! and received a 1965 Tony Award nomination for Best Featured Actress in a Musical. She also appeared in several stage productions including Lionel Bart's musical flop Twang!! (1965) (directed by Joan Littlewood), The Beggar's Opera (1967), Come Spy with Me (1966–67) with Danny La Rue and in 30 pantomimes between 1950 and 2011.

In 1970, she landed the role of music hall legend Marie Lloyd in the musical-biopic Sing A Rude Song. In 1972, she appeared in the West End in Tony Richardson's The Threepenny Opera with Vanessa Redgrave. In 1975, she toured the UK, New Zealand, and South Africa in her own show, Carry On Barbara!, and followed this with the role of Maria in Twelfth Night at the Chichester Festival Theatre.

In 1981, she played sex-mad landlady Kath in Joe Orton's black comedy Entertaining Mr Sloane at the Lyric Hammersmith, directed by her friend Kenneth Williams. She reprised the role for a national tour with the National Theatre in 1993 co-starring John Challis  of Only Fools and Horses fame.

EastEnders

When EastEnders was launched in 1985, the producers said they would not cast well-known actors (although Wendy Richard was a rare exception). Windsor has said that she would have liked to have been part of the original cast. By 1994, this policy was relaxed, and Windsor accepted an offer to join EastEnders. She took over the role of Peggy Mitchell (who was previously a minor character played by Jo Warne in 1991). Peggy was the widowed mother of established key characters Phil and Grant Mitchell, and younger sister Samantha. For this role, she received the Best Actress award at the 1999 British Soap Awards, and a Lifetime Achievement Award at the 2009 British Soap Awards.

A debilitating case of the Epstein–Barr virus forced a two-year absence from the role between 2003 and 2005, although Windsor was able to make a two-episode guest appearance in 2004. She rejoined the cast full-time in the summer of 2005. In October 2009, Windsor announced she was to leave her role as Peggy Mitchell, saying she wanted to spend more time with her husband. On 10 September 2010, her character left Albert Square after a fire destroyed the Queen Victoria pub, of which she was the owner.

In July 2013, it was announced that Windsor was to return for one episode, which aired on 20 September 2013. She again returned for a single episode on 25 September 2014, and made a further appearance for EastEnders 30th anniversary on 17 February 2015. In February 2015, Windsor, along with Pam St Clement (Pat Evans), took part in EastEnders: Back to Ours to celebrate 30 years of EastEnders. Windsor and St. Clement looked back on some of their characters' most dramatic moments.

In November 2015, Windsor secretly filmed a return to EastEnders, which was shown in January 2016. After this,  the character was confirmed to be killed off later in the year. This was Windsor's decision, as she said that she would always be open to a return to the show unless bosses decided to kill the character off. Her last appearance aired on BBC One on 17 May 2016. On 25 January 2022, by which time Windsor had died, an episode aired in which Peggy's son Phil Mitchell (Steve McFadden) hears his mother's voice giving him advice. The scene was made using archived audio from previous episodes.

Later years
Windsor hosted two series of the BBC documentary Disaster Masters in 2005.
Windsor provided the voice of the Dormouse in Walt Disney's live-action adaptation of Lewis Carroll's Alice in Wonderland (2010), directed by Tim Burton. Windsor appeared in the pantomime Dick Whittington at the Bristol Hippodrome over the Christmas/New Year period of 2010/2011. In September 2010, it was announced that Windsor would be fronting a TV campaign for online bingo site Jackpotjoy as the Queen of Bingo. She appeared as herself in one episode of Come Fly with Me in January 2011.

From 2011 onwards, she regularly did presenting work for BBC Radio 2 music and showbusiness history programmes, and also was a regular stand in for Elaine Paige on Elaine Paige on Sunday. She reprised her voice role of the Dormouse in the film Alice Through the Looking Glass (2016).

In 2016, Windsor was invited to switch on the Blackpool Illuminations 57 years after her co-star in the film Too Hot to Handle, Jayne Mansfield, had performed the task during a break in filming.

In May 2017, Windsor appeared in a cameo role as herself in BBC Television's biopic about her life, Babs, written by EastEnders scriptwriter Tony Jordan. It showed Windsor in the 1990s as she prepared to go on stage, and recalled events from her life, including her childhood, marriage to gangster Ronnie Knight, and her roles in the Carry On films.

Personal life
Windsor was married three times, and had no children.

 Ronnie Knight, (married 2 March 1964, divorced January 1985)
 Stephen Hollings, chef/restaurateur (married 12 April 1986 in Jamaica, divorced 1995)
 Scott Mitchell, former actor and recruitment consultant (married 8 April 2000)

Prior to her marriage to Knight, Windsor had a one-night stand with East End criminal Reggie Kray, and a longer relationship with his older brother Charlie Kray. During the time of making her later Carry On films, she had a well-publicised affair with her fellow actor and co-star Sid James, which lasted 3 years until 1976. Windsor was initially uninterested in James, 24 years her senior, but later stated that she thought she would have sex with him once and then he would go away, but James reportedly became obsessed with Windsor and became suffocatingly possessive of her to the extent that during the Carry On London! tour, he shouted at Bernard Bresslaw because he had helped Windsor off the stage, the only reason being that Bresslaw had touched Windsor. James, who, like Windsor, was also already married, would send her a dozen red roses with a note attached with the words "Love Romeo" and even arranged to see her in Australia during her Carry On Barbara one-woman show, as he could not bear to be without her. He would also state his love for her in public and to Windsor's friends, but after the affair began damaging Windsor's  mental health, she ended it. Devastated by her decision, James became depressed and started to drink strong whisky, and died soon after from a heart attack. Another of Windsor's Carry On co-stars, Kenneth Williams, accompanied  Knight and her  on their honeymoon, and also brought his mother and sister with him.

Windsor also dated Gary Crosby in the 1960s, and had brief sexual encounters with Victor Mature, Anthony Newley, Ronnie Scott, James Booth, George Best,
and Maurice Gibb, the latter two while she was still married to Ronnie Knight. In the late 1950s, Windsor became engaged to singer Cliff Lawrence, but he physically beat her. In her autobiography, All of Me, Windsor stated that she often turned up at Winston's, the club where she sang, with a black eye, and detailed one occasion when Lawrence dragged her down the street by her hair. Windsor ended the relationship and then started dating Ronnie Knight. Windsor said that Lawrence would spy on her and Knight from telephone boxes, and only left them alone after Knight threatened him.

In her autobiography, Windsor talked about her five abortions: three in her 20s, and the last at the age of 42. She said she never wanted children as a result of her father rejecting her after her parents' divorce.

Windsor was best friends with fellow actor Anna Karen, whom she met while filming Carry On Camping and who later went on to play Peggy Mitchell's sister Aunt Sal in EastEnders for 20 years.

Windsor was friends with Amy Winehouse and in 2012, became a patron of the Amy Winehouse Foundation and in 2014, Windsor unveiled the statue of Winehouse in Camden Market.

Health
In April 2014, Windsor was diagnosed with Alzheimer's disease. She chose not to make the condition public, but it was known to her friends and colleagues. On 10 May 2018, Windsor's husband, Scott Mitchell, publicly revealed her condition. In January 2019, Mitchell and some of Windsor's former co-stars from EastEnders announced that they would be running the London Marathon in aid of a dementia campaign. Mitchell said that Windsor's health and mental state had been deteriorating, and she had  moments when she no longer recognised him.

On Windsor's 82nd birthday in August 2019,  Mitchell and she became ambassadors for the Alzheimer's Society. On the same day, Mitchell and Windsor appeared in a video for the charity, in which Windsor said, "Unite with me, against dementia". Mitchell highlighted the problems many face with the disease, and urged viewers to sign a letter to Prime Minister Boris Johnson, saying he "urgently needs to address these challenges." In August 2020, BBC News reported that Windsor had been moved into a care home in London.

Death
Windsor died on 10 December 2020, aged 83. The next episode of EastEnders, broadcast on 11 December 2020, was dedicated to Windsor's memory. As well as this, the 2017 biopic Babs, which documented Windsor's life, was also broadcast. Among those who paid tributes to her were her EastEnders co-stars, entertainers, politicians including Boris Johnson, former Prime Minister David Cameron, Leader of the Opposition Keir Starmer, and members of the Royal family, Prince William, Duke of Cambridge—who described Windsor as "a true national treasure ... a giant of the entertainment world"—and Charles, Prince of Wales with his wife Camilla, Duchess of Cornwall.

Windsor's funeral took place on 8 January 2021. Her body was cremated at Golders Green Crematorium. The service was attended by Anna Karen, Christopher Biggins, Ross Kemp, David Walliams, and Matt Lucas, amongst others, although numbers were limited due to the COVID-19 pandemic. Floral decorations on Windsor's coffin made out the words "The Dame", "Saucy" (Windsor's catchphrase in the Carry On films) and "The Queen Peggy". Windsor's funeral programme featured the famous photo of her in Carry On Camping, a photo that she said "will follow me right to the end".

In popular culture
Windsor was played by Samantha Spiro in Terry Johnson's play Cleo, Camping, Emmanuelle and Dick, which premiered at the National Theatre in 1998. Rachel Clarke took over the role of Windsor in the touring production of the play in 2001. Spiro reprised the role in the subsequent film adaptation, Cor, Blimey!. The latter also featured a cameo appearance from Windsor, playing herself.

In the 2006 BBC television film Kenneth Williams: Fantabulosa!, Windsor was again played by Rachel Clarke. Spiro reprised her role as Windsor in the biopic Babs in 2017, with Jaime Winstone and Honor Kneafsey playing younger versions of Windsor.

Honours

Windsor was appointed Member of the Order of the British Empire (MBE) in the 2000 New Year Honours, and in  the same year, she was the first person to be inducted into the newly created BBC Hall of Fame. In August 2010, she was given the Freedom of the City of London, and in November 2010, she was honoured by the City of Westminster at a tree planting and plaque ceremony.

She was inducted into the Hackney Empire Walk of Fame on 25 May 2017.

She was appointed Dame Commander of the Order of the British Empire (DBE) in the 2016 New Year Honours for services to charity and entertainment.

In November 2014, she was awarded an honorary doctorate from the University of East London.

Commonwealth honours

Scholastic

 Chancellor, visitor, governor, rector and fellowships

Honorary degrees

Freedom of the City

  4 August 2010: London.

Filmography

Film

Television

References

External links

 
 
 
 

1937 births
2020 deaths
20th-century English actresses
21st-century English actresses
Actresses awarded damehoods
Actresses from London
Alumni of the Aida Foster Theatre School
British comedy actresses
Dames Commander of the Order of the British Empire
Deaths from Alzheimer's disease
English film actresses
English people of Irish descent
English soap opera actresses
English stage actresses
English television actresses
English television personalities
Deaths from dementia in England
People from Harringay
People from Shoreditch
Women autobiographers
Golders Green Crematorium